Lufthansa Cargo Flight 527 was a Lufthansa cargo flight scheduled to fly from Rio de Janeiro in Brazil to Dakar, the capital of Senegal. On 26 July 1979, shortly after take-off in Rio, the Boeing 707 flew into a slope and crashed. All 3 crew members, consisting of the captain, the first officer and a flight engineer died; there were no survivors. The principal cause of the crash was the failure of air traffic controllers to pay the necessary attention to each aircraft and ensure the necessary attention to rising terrain.

Accident 
The aircraft was a cargo variant of the Boeing 707 (707-330C). Approach control requested the pilot to increase their speed. After communicating his instructions, the controller monitoring Flight 527 turned to focus on other flights near Rio, and was unaware of Flight 527 overspeeding.

By the time the controller resumed communications with Flight 527, he saw that the flight was further north than expected due to its greater speed. He then radioed the crew: "Lufthansa, turn right heading 140, just now, over. Lufthansa 527, turn right heading 140 and climb without restrictions." The crew responded: "Roger, leaving 2 thousand, LH 527, turning right heading 140."

Investigation 
The main cause was found to be the failure of Brazilian air traffic controllers to pay the necessary attention to each aircraft and thus both stagger the aircraft among themselves and ensure the necessary distances to rising terrain.

The improperly high speed of the Boeing 707 was both due to faulty instructions and monitoring by the controller, as well as the crew passively accepting the dangerous instructions.  Normally, the release includes a departure route to a so-called clearance limit, up to which the aircraft is allowed to fly at most. Even when asked by the pilots, air traffic control gave only an unclear answer. In the clearance for LH527 this information was missing, so the crew continued to fly on the set course instead of asking air traffic control for new instructions.  For almost all of the last two minutes, there was no communication between LH527 and air traffic control.

See also

Prinair Flight 277

References 

Boeing 707
Transport in Rio de Janeiro (city)
Aviation accidents and incidents in 1979
Lufthansa
Aviation accidents and incidents in Brazil
Airliner accidents and incidents involving controlled flight into terrain
Airliner accidents and incidents caused by pilot error
Aviation accidents and incidents caused by air traffic controller error
Accidents and incidents involving the Boeing 707
Lufthansa accidents and incidents